King Ferry is a hamlet in the town of Genoa, Cayuga County, New York, United States. King Ferry has a post office with ZIP code 13081, which opened on December 15, 1807.

References

Hamlets in Cayuga County, New York
Hamlets in New York (state)